Dr. Radwan al-Habib (born 1962) is the current Minister of Social Affairs and Labor for Syria, serving since 2011.

Early life, education and career
Al-Habib was born in the Aleppo Governorate in 1962. He earned a law degree from the University of Aleppo in 1986, a Diploma (Doctorate) in Advanced Studies in commercial law from the University of Gwatier in France, and a Ph.D. in corporate administration in 1997. He was a member of the People's Council of Syria for the Aleppo Governorate from 2003 to 2007 (8th assembly), and Vice President in the 9th assembly.

Al-Habib was a lecturer and later a faculty member of the Department (Faculty) of Law at the University of Aleppo. He was also a member of the Legal Office in the University of Aleppo branch of the Baath Arab Socialist Party.

Personal life
Al-Habib is married and has four children.

See also
Cabinet of Syria

References

Minister of Social Affairs and Labor Dr. Radwan al-Habib, SANA
Biography of the new Syrian government 2011 - the names and lives of government ministers , Syria FM, 17 April 2011

External links
Ministry of Social Affairs and Labor official government website

1962 births
Living people
University of Aleppo alumni
Government ministers of Syria
Academic staff of the University of Aleppo